Logistics, or Logistics Art Project, is a 2012 Swedish experimental film conceived and created by Erika Magnusson and Daniel Andersson. At 51,420 minutes (857 hours or 35 days and 17 hours), it is the longest film ever made.

Production

In 2008, Erika Magnusson and Daniel Andersson asked themselves where modern electronic gadgets come from.  They conceived the idea to follow the production cycle of a pedometer in reverse chronological order from end sales back to its origin and manufacture.  The route of the journey commenced in Stockholm, then proceeded through Insjön, Gothenburg, Bremerhaven, Rotterdam, Algeciras, Málaga, and finished in Shenzhen at the manufacturer in Bao'an.

The project was filmed in real time during a trip to and in locations at a factory, following the route of the product's manufacture from the store in Stockholm where it was purchased to the factory in China where it was manufactured.

Screening

See also 

 List of longest films

References

External links 
 
 

2012 films
Swedish documentary films
2010s road movies
Films shot in China
2010s Swedish films